Thapsia grandis is a species of air-breathing land snail or semi-slug, a terrestrial pulmonate gastropod mollusk in the family Urocyclidae.

Distribution
This species is endemic to Tanzania.

References

 Verdcourt, B. (1982). Notes on East African land and freshwater snails, 12-15. Zoologische Mededelingen, 56 (18): 217-236. Leiden.

Fauna of Tanzania
Thapsia
Taxonomy articles created by Polbot